Lieven Bauwens (14 June 1769, in Ghent – 17 March 1822, in Paris) was a Belgian entrepreneur and industrial spy who was sent to Great Britain at a young age and brought a spinning mule and skilled workers to the European continent.

He started textile plants in Paris (1799) and Ghent (1800). In Ghent he was also mayor for one year. As a leading industrial, he was visited by Napoleon in 1810 and awarded the Legion d'Honneur.

In 1801, Bauwens smuggled a spinning mule and steam engine out of Great Britain to help set up the textile industry in Flanders. 

The spinning mule that was brought to Ghent can still be visited, in the Industrial Museum .

See also
William Cockerill

References

External links
 Industrial Museum

1769 births
1822 deaths
19th-century Belgian engineers
Belgian expatriates in the United Kingdom
Businesspeople from Ghent
People of the Industrial Revolution
Textile workers
Mayors of Ghent
19th-century industrialists
19th-century Belgian businesspeople